Rasim Kara (born 10 June 1950) is a Turkish former football player and manager. A goalkeeper, he played for Bursaspor, Beşiktaş and the Turkey national team.

Playing career
Born in Eskişehir, Kara began playing as a goalkeeper with the youth side of Eskişehir Işıkspor. He would later join Uşakspor and Bursaspor. During his tenure with Bursaspor, he was promoted to the national team. He reached his peak of career with joining  Beşiktaş in the 1975–76 season where he will have spent his nine years. He achieved the Turkish League title in the 1981–82 season. Kara retired football in 1984.

Kara played for Turkey in the UEFA Euro 1976 qualifying rounds.

Managerial career
Kara trained Antalyaspor prior to his vice-coaching tasks with Sepp Piontek and Fatih Terim subsequently for Turkish national team. Most notably, he contributed the success of team accessing the Euro 96 for the very first time in history. Following this achievement, he was hired by Beşiktaş as team coach.

Whilst his one-season period with Beşiktaş in 1996–97, Kara showed some decent displays as team had competed for the title for the last week just after Galatasaray. Team also broke the "top average scoring per year" record, with creating one of the best performances in European cups. Despite this successful season, Kara had to leave the team. After that, he owned Bursaspor, Çanakkale Dardanelspor, Çaykur Rizespor, Kocaelispor within short terms.

Kara also coached abroad. He coached Canadian side Ottawa Wizards and led the team for a league title. Then he moved to Azerbaijan, east neighbour of Turkey for coaching FK Khazar Lenkoran. He was in charge for two years there before he signed for FK Qarabağ. He unexpectedly left FK Qarabağ a week before the start of the 2008–09 season, despite having one-year contract with the club and moved back to his former team FK Khazar Lenkoran. Has been penalized for his attitude by Football Federation of Azerbaijan AFFA and forced to pay compensation to his former club.

Honours
Individual
Beşiktaş J.K. Squads of Century (Bronze Team)

References

External links
 
 
 

1950 births
Living people
Turkish football managers
Bursaspor footballers
Beşiktaş J.K. footballers
Antalyaspor managers
Beşiktaş J.K. managers
Bursaspor managers
Turkish footballers
Turkey international footballers
Sportspeople from Eskişehir
Süper Lig managers
Expatriate soccer managers in Canada
Expatriate football managers in Azerbaijan
Kocaelispor managers
Turkish people of Circassian descent
Turkey under-21 international footballers
Qarabağ FK managers
Khazar Lankaran FK managers
Canadian Soccer League (1998–present) managers
Association football goalkeepers
Turkish expatriate football managers